The East Light (Hangul: 더 이스트라이트, stylized as TheEastLight.) was a South Korean band formed by Media Line Entertainment. The band originally consisted of six members, who made their official debut with the single "Holla" on November 3, 2016. Members Seokcheol and Seunghyun later spoke out and filed a lawsuit against the agency, while Media Line Entertainment has removed Eunsung, Junwook, Sagang and Woojin from the group to prevent future complications from the lawsuit.

History
Prior to debuting, Eunsung, Woojin, and Sagang were contestants on the Mnet show Voice Kids Korea. Sagang was also a contestant on the Mnet show Superstar K3, while Eunsung had made a cameo appearance in Monstar as the young Kyu-dong and Seokcheol appeared in the 2014 film My Boy alongside Cha In-pyo and Lee Tae-ran. Junwook appeared on the SBS show Star King as the "thirteen-year-old guitar prodigy".

In 2017, Woojin competed on Produce 101 Season 2 and finished in 34th place. Eunsung and Sagang also competed on I Can See Your Voice (season 4 episode 10) and became the winners of the episode, winning the chance to duet with Highlight (the guest) and releasing a digital single titled "Café Latte" (a cover of the Urban Zakapa song).

Sagang has appeared as an MC on a game show called 놀자고go on EBS (Educational Broadcasting System), presenting with Ji Min-hyuk, Min Ka-rin (A member of  Elris), Hyeju, and Jeong Seong-yeong.

Abuse allegations
On October 18, 2018, news outlet XSportsNews reported allegations of physical and mental abuse against members of The East Light by a producer, while the CEO watched the abuse and did nothing about it. Member Seokcheol held a press conference on October 19, 2018, confirming the abuse allegations.

Media Line Entertainment issued an apology, but denied some of the allegations made by the media. On October 22, 2018, Media Line Entertainment announced that they terminated the contracts of members Eunsung, Sagang, Woojin and Junwook.

Past members
 Lee Seok-cheol (Hangul: 이석철) – leader, drums, DJ
 Lee Eun-sung (이은성) – vocals, keyboards
 Lee Seung-hyun (이승현) – bass guitar
 Kim Jun-wook (김준욱) – guitars
 Jeong Sa-gang (정사강) – vocals, guitars
 Lee Woo-jin (이우진) – vocals, keyboards

Discography

Extended plays

Single albums

Music videos

Other videos

References

External links

South Korean boy bands
2016 establishments in South Korea
Musical groups established in 2016
South Korean pop rock music groups
Musical groups from Seoul